"Heaven Help Us All" is a 1970 soul single composed by Ron Miller and first performed by Motown singer Stevie Wonder.  The song continued Wonder's string of Top 10 singles on the pop charts reaching #9 on the Hot 100 singles chart and #2 on the R&B chart, the latter causing it to be his first runner-up since "Yester-Me, Yester-You, Yesterday". It was one of four hits Wonder scored from his Signed, Sealed & Delivered album. The song has since been covered dozens of times in a variety of styles.

Background
"Heaven Help Us All" showcased a departure from Wonder's earlier works by displaying an earthier, gospel-infused sound.Cash Box reviewed the song stating that "Super Wonder surges back with another step into the total performer portrait that he has been cultivating" and that he "turns up with another all-format effort that will win across the board acceptance" and that "excellent contemporary lyric and Wonder's delivery wrap up blockbuster results."

Chart history

References

External links
 Lyrics of this song
 

1970 singles
1970 songs
Stevie Wonder songs
Joan Baez songs
Songs written by Ron Miller (songwriter)
Motown singles
Ray Charles songs
Ike & Tina Turner songs
Melba Moore songs
Bon Jovi songs